The National Workers Party can refer to:
National Workers Party (Pakistan), a left-wing party.
National Workers' Party (Spain), a far right party.
National Workers' Party, a centre party from Poland.
National Workers' Party (United Kingdom) a far right party led by A. F. X. Baron

See also
Workers' Party